NGC 4463 is an open cluster in the constellation Musca. The young planetary nebula He 2-86 is believed to be a member of the cluster.

References

External links
 

4463
Open clusters

Musca (constellation)